This is a List of clubs in the Bayernliga, including all clubs and their final placings from 1945–46 to the current season. The league, commonly referred to as the Bayernliga, is the highest football league in the state of Bavaria and the Bavarian football league system. It is one of fourteen Oberligas in German football, the fifth tier of the German football league system. Until the introduction of the 3. Liga in 2008 it was the fourth tier of the league system, until the introduction of the Regionalligas in 1994 the third tier.

Overview
The league's history however traces back to 1945, after the end of the Second World War, when it was formed under the name of Landesliga Bayern as a tier-two league with nine clubs in it. From 1946 to 1948, it was split into a northern and a southern group but than, from 1948, reunited once more. In 1951, it changed its name to Amateurliga Bayern and became a tier-three league following the formation of the 2. Oberliga Süd above it. Two years later, the league was once more divided into two regional division, which remained in place until 1963. With the inception of the Bundesliga in 1963, the Bayernliga returned to a single-division format and, in 1978, the league changed its name to Amateur-Oberliga-Bayern. In 1994, when the Regionalliga Süd was formed, the league changed its official name once more, now to Oberliga Bayern, and became a tier four league.

With the establishment of the Regionalliga Bayern in 2012, the league was split once more into a northern and a southern division.

Because the 2019–20 season was interrupted by the coronavirus disease 2019 (COVID-19) pandemic in Germany that broke out in March 2020, it was later suspended until 31 August, forcing a cancellation of the 2020–21 season as the Bavarian Football Association approved a resumption of the preceding one, which was curtailed in May 2021.

League timeline
The league went through the following timeline of name changes, format and position in the league system:

List of clubs
This is a complete list of clubs, as of the 2022–23 season, sorted by the last season a club played in the league:

Key

Notes
1 TSV Vestenbergsgreuth merged with SpVgg Fürth in 1996 to form SpVgg Greuther Fürth.
2 FC Ingolstadt 04 is a merger of MTV Ingolstadt and ESV Ingolstadt in 2004.
3 SG Post/Süd Regensburg merged with Jahn Regensburg in 2002 and became Jahn Regensburg II. SSV Jahn Regensburg II was relegated in 2006 because the first team was relegated to the Bayernliga.
4 The football departments of SpVgg Starnberg merged with FT Starnberg 09 to form FC Starnberg in 1992. In 2001, FC Starnberg was dissolved and the football department re-joined FT Starnberg 09.
5 Jahn Forchheim withdrew from the league in 2000.
6 1. FC Bamberg merged with TSV Eintracht Bamberg to form 1. FC Eintracht Bamberg. 1. FC Eintracht declared bankruptcy and folded in 2010. FC Eintracht Bamberg was formed immediately as its successor.
7 BC Augsburg merged with the football department of TSV Schwaben Augsburg in 1969 to form FC Augsburg. TSV Schwaben Augsburg shortly after reformed its football department.
8 In 2011, FC Ismaning declined promotion; runners-up FC Ingolstadt II promoted instead.
9 In 2011, SpVgg Weiden declared insolvency and withdrew from the Regionalliga. 
10 TSV 04 Schwabach merged with 1. SC Schwabach in 1996 to form SC 04 Schwabach.
11 FC Bayern Hof merged with SpVgg Hof in 2005 to form SpVgg Bayern Hof.
12 In 2003, 1. FC Bayreuth and BSV 98 Bayreuth merged to form FSV Bayreuth. BSV 98 Bayreuth itself had been formed in a merger of VfB Bayreuth and TuSpo Bayreuth in 1968.
13 In 2000, VfB Coburg merged with DJK/Viktoria Coburg to form DVV Coburg. DVV Coburg was disbanded in June 2012 with a new club, FC Coburg, taking over its football teams and league place.
14 In 1995, 1. FC Amberg was declared bankrupt and folded. A new club, the FC Amberg, was formed, initially within the TV Amberg.
15 In 2003 SpVgg Grün-Weiss Deggendorf was formed through a merger of SpVgg Deggendorf and SV Grün-Weiss Deggendorf. Bayernliga seasons before the merger were played by SpVgg Deggendorf.
16 BC Aichach and Wacker Burghausen II withdrew from the Bayernliga after the end of the 2013–14 season.
17 FSV Gostenhof 83 and ESV Nürnberg-West merged in 1998 to form SG Nürnberg Fürth.
18 In 2017, SV Pullach declined promotion; runners-up FC Unterföhring promoted instead.
19 Würzburger Kickers withdrew their under-23 team from the league and closed it in 2019.

Clubs and their placings

Landesliga Bayern 1945–50
The complete list of clubs and placings in the Bayernliga while operating under the official name of Landesliga Bayern. From 1946 to 1948, the league operated in two regional divisions:

Amateurliga Bayern 1950–63
The complete list of clubs and placings in the Bayernliga while operating under the official name of Amateurliga Bayern, before the introduction of the Bundesliga. From 1953 to 1963, the league operated in two regional divisions, south and north:

South
The Amateurliga Südayern and the southern clubs of the unified league, operating until 1953:

North
The Amateurliga Nordayern and the northern clubs of the unified league, operating until 1953:

Amateurliga Bayern 1963–1978
The complete list of clubs and placings in the Bayernliga while operating under the official name of Amateurliga Bayern:

Amateur-Oberliga Bayern 1978–1994
The complete list of clubs and placings in the Bayernliga while operating under the official name of Amateur-Oberliga Bayern:

Oberliga Bayern 1994–2012
The complete list of clubs and placings in the Bayernliga while operating under the official name of Oberliga Bayern:

Bayern Nord 2012–present
The complete list of clubs and placings in the Bayernliga Nord since the league was sub-divided into two divisions:

Bayern Süd 2012–present
The complete list of clubs and placings in the Bayernliga Süd since the league was sub-divided into two divisions:

Placings for 2020 were based on the tables at the point of suspension during the coronavirus pandemic. Final placings were determined on a points per game basis at the curtailment of the resumed 2019–20 season in 2021.

Key

References

Sources
 Die Bayernliga 1945 - 1997,  published by the DSFS, 1998
 Deutschlands Fußball in Zahlen,  An annual publication with tables and results from the Bundesliga to Verbandsliga/Landesliga, publisher: DSFS
 Kicker Almanach,  The yearbook on German football from Bundesliga to Oberliga, since 1937, published by the Kicker Sports Magazine
 Süddeutschlands Fußballgeschichte in Tabellenform 1897-1988  History of Southern German football in tables, publisher & author: Ludolf Hyll
 50 Jahre Bayrischer Fußball-Verband  50-year-anniversary book of the Bavarian FA, publisher: Vindelica Verlag, 1996
 Die Deutsche Liga-Chronik 1945-2005  History of German football from 1945 to 2005 in tables, publisher: DSFS, 2006

External links 
 Bayerischer Fußball-Verband (Bavarian FA) 
 Das deutsche Fußball Archiv Historic German league tables 
 Bavarian League tables and results 
 Website with tables and results from the Bavarian Oberliga to Bezirksliga 

Clubs
1